= The Webster (restaurant) =

Restaurant in Iowa City, Iowa, U.S.

- Interactive map of The Webster

Restaurant information
- Established: May 2021
- Location: 202 North Linn Street, Iowa City, Iowa, 52245, United States
- Coordinates: 41°39′49.5″N 91°31′53″W

The Webster is a restaurant in Iowa City, Iowa. Established in May 2021, the business was included in The New York Times's 2023 list of the 50 most exciting restaurants in the United States. It serves American cuisine.
